Michael Sifris is a Trials Division justice at the Supreme Court of Victoria. In his career he practiced as a solicitor in both South Africa and Australia. He is a former partner of Schwarz, Goldblatt, Bloch & Gross, and is a graduate of the graduate law program at the University of Melbourne.

References

Judges of the Supreme Court of Victoria
University of Melbourne alumni
Living people
Year of birth missing (living people)